Philipp Franz Heinrich Carl (19 June 1837 – 24 January 1891) was a German physicist.

He was born at Neustadt, Middle Franconia. He studied the exact sciences in Munich as a pupil of Philipp von Jolly and Johann von Lamont (graduation 1860). He then worked as an assistant to Lamont, performing astronomical and geophysical research at the observatory (Universitäts-Sternwarte München). In 1865 he established, and for several years thereafter directed, a workshop for the manufacture of mathematical instruments. In 1869 he was named professor of physics at the Royal Bavarian Military Training Institutes.

Publications
He established also the Repertoriums der Experimentalphysik, der physikalischen Technik und der astronomischen Instrumentenkunde in 1865, which he edited until 1882. His published works include:

 Die Principien der astronomischen Instrumentenkunde (1863).
 Repertorium der Kometenastronomie (1864).

References

1837 births
1891 deaths
19th-century German physicists
Ludwig Maximilian University of Munich alumni
People from Neustadt (Aisch)-Bad Windsheim